Mircea Popa (born 21 June 1962) is a Romanian former football right-back. His son, Horațiu Popa was also a footballer.

International career
Mircea Popa played three friendly games at international level for Romania, making his debut in a 2–2 against Poland when he came as a substitute, replacing Mircea Rednic at half-time.

Notes

References

External links
 

1962 births
Living people
Romanian footballers
Romania international footballers
Association football defenders
Liga I players
Liga II players
CSM Jiul Petroșani players
CS Minerul Lupeni players
FC Sportul Studențesc București players
FC Progresul București players
People from Petroșani